Crassispira flavocarinata is a species of sea snail, a marine gastropod mollusk in the family Pseudomelatomidae.

Description
The length of the shell attains 12 mm, its diameter 5 mm.

The ovate shell contains 9 whorls. The uniform deep brown or chestnut colour, the very stout yellow keel around the upper part of the whorls, and the little numerous ribs on the lower are the principal cliaracteristics. The keel is edged above, or, in other words, is not quite contiguous with the suture. The sculpture is very like that of Crassispira discors (Sowerby I, 1834)

Distribution
This marine species occurs off Panama

References

External links
 

flavocarinata
Gastropods described in 1882